Time Sharing Option (TSO) is an interactive time-sharing environment for IBM mainframe operating systems, including OS/360 MVT, OS/VS2 (SVS), MVS, OS/390, and z/OS.

Use 
In computing, time-sharing is a design technique that allows many people to use a computer system concurrently and independently—without interfering with each other. Each TSO user is isolated; it appears to each one that they are the only user of the system.

TSO is most commonly used by mainframe system administrators and programmers. It provides:
 A text editor
 Batch job support, including completion notification
 Debuggers for some programming languages used on System/360 and later IBM mainframes
 Support for other vendors' end-user applications, for example for querying IMS and DB2 databases

TSO interacts with users in either a line-by-line mode or in a full screen, menu-driven mode. In the line-by-line mode, the user enters commands by typing them in at the keyboard; in turn, the system interprets the commands, and then displays responses on the terminal screen. But most mainframe interaction is actually via ISPF, which allows for customized menu-driven interaction. This combination is called TSO/ISPF. TSO can also provide a Unix-style environment on OS/390 and z/OS via the UNIX System Services command shell, with or without ISPF.

TSO commands can be embedded in REXX execs or CLISTs, which can run interactively or in batch.

TSO eliminated the need to punch cards on a keypunch machine, and send card decks to the computer room to be read by a card reading machine.

History 
When it was originally introduced in 1971, IBM considered time-sharing an "optional feature", as compared to standard batch processing, and hence offered TSO as an option for OS/360 MVT. With the introduction of MVS in 1974, IBM made it a standard component of their top-end mainframe operating system. TSO/E ("Time Sharing Option/Extensions") is a set of extensions to the original TSO. TSO/E is a base element of z/OS. Before z/OS, TSO Extensions (TSO/E) was an element of OS/390 and was a licensed program for the MVS and MVS/ESA System Products. Since all z/OS installations usually have both TSO and TSO/E functions installed, it is normal to refer to both TSO and TSO/E as "TSO".

When first released, TSO module names always had the "prefix" IKJ, plus the second and third letters of the associated pre-TSO functional group (IEA = original functional group of "supervisor", hence a TSO module name of IKJEAxxx, IEB = original functional group of "dataset utilities", hence a TSO module name of IKJEBxxx, etc.).

Batch use 
It is common to run TSO in batch (as opposed to interactively): all the usual TSO line-mode interactive commands can be also executed via Job Control Language (JCL) by running any of the programs IKJEFT01, IKJEFT1A, and IKJEFT1B and supplying the line commands in a file pointed to by the SYSTSIN DD. The primary difference between the three programs is their handling of return codes from the executed commands.

Batch execution of TSO is one way to allow an IBM mainframe application to access DB2 resources.

See also 
 History of IBM mainframe operating systems
 Michigan Terminal System
 MUSIC/SP
 ORVYL and WYLBUR

References

Further reading

External links 
 Several TSO manuals from the early 1970s, available from the BitSavers.org archive

IBM mainframe operating systems
Time-sharing operating systems